The Ball Range is a mountain range on the Continental Divide between Vermilion Pass and Red Earth Pass in Kootenay National Park, Canada. The range is named after John Ball, a politician who helped secure funding for the Palliser expedition.

It extends over 465 km2 (179 mi2), and measures 35 km (22 mi) from North to South and 26 km (16 mi) from East to West.

Peaks
This range includes the following mountains and peaks:

See also
 Ranges of the Canadian Rockies

References

Mountain ranges of British Columbia
Ranges of the Canadian Rockies